is a Japanese ice hockey player. He competed in the men's tournaments at the 1972 Winter Olympics, the 1976 Winter Olympics and the 1980 Winter Olympics.

References

External links
 

1950 births
Living people
Japanese ice hockey players
Olympic ice hockey players of Japan
Ice hockey players at the 1972 Winter Olympics
Ice hockey players at the 1976 Winter Olympics
Ice hockey players at the 1980 Winter Olympics
Sportspeople from Tochigi Prefecture
Asian Games silver medalists for Japan
Medalists at the 1986 Asian Winter Games
Ice hockey players at the 1986 Asian Winter Games
Asian Games medalists in ice hockey
20th-century Japanese people
21st-century Japanese people